A Non-constituency Member of Parliament (NCMP) is a member of an opposition political party in Singapore who, according to the Constitution and Parliamentary Elections Act, is declared to have been elected a Member of Parliament (MP) without constituency representation, despite having lost in a general election, by virtue of having been one of the best-performing losers. When less than 12 opposition MPs have been elected, the number of NCMPs is the difference to total 12. NCMPs enjoy all of the privileges of ordinary Members of Parliament.

The incumbent NCMP are Leong Mun Wai & Hazel Poa from the Progress Singapore Party since 16 July 2020.

History
The NCMP scheme was introduced in 1984, and was a significant modification of the single-member simple-plurality electoral system traditionally associated with Westminster systems of government. Since the ruling People's Action Party had won all parliamentary seats in the four general elections since independence, Prime Minister Lee Kuan Yew argued that the NCMP scheme would ensure that opposition voices would be heard in Parliament. According to him, this would be beneficial to Singapore as it would give the younger generation of Singaporeans a chance to see what an opposition can or cannot do. When the first constitutional amendment was made to initiate the NCMP scheme, between three and six NCMPs were allowed in Parliament. In 2010, the Constitution was amended again to allow for a maximum of nine NCMPs in Parliament. With effect from 2017, the maximum number of NCMPs increased from nine to 12, and they were conferred the same voting powers in Parliament as elected MPs.

Since its inception, the scheme has been widely criticised. It has been considered undemocratic as it allows candidates who do not have the mandate of the people to air their views in Parliament. Furthermore, members of the opposition have criticized the scheme for creating an unequal playing field in a general election by enabling the ruling People's Action Party (PAP) to argue that the electorate need not vote for opposition candidates as there will already be opposition representation in Parliament. Despite this critique, several opposition politicians have accepted NCMP seats, including 2 different parties like Lee Siew-Choh, J. B. Jeyaretnam and Sylvia Lim from the Workers' Party and also Steve Chia from Singapore Democratic Alliance. NCMPs have raised notable points in Parliament with regards to various public policy issues such as criminal procedure, education, health and social welfare.

The 2011 general election brought three NCMPs into Parliament from 2 different political parties: Lina Loh (the wife of Chiam See Tong, the former MP for Potong Pasir Single Member Constituency) of the Singapore People's Party, and Gerald Giam and Yee Jenn Jong of the Workers' Party. 

The 2015 general election brought in three different NCMPs into Parliament which only consists of one political party: Dennis Tan, Leon Perera and Daniel Goh from the Worker's Party. A NCMP seat was offered to former MP for Punggol East SMC, Lee Li Lian from the Worker's Party but she declined and the seat was eventually accepted by Associate Professor Daniel Goh also from the Worker's Party. 

The 2020 general election brought in two different NCMPs into Parliament which consists of one political party: Leong Mun Wai & Hazel Poa from the Progress Singapore Party. This also marks the Workers' Party candidates did not enter parliament as NCMPs this time as the offer was made to the Progress Singapore Party as the best performing losers.

Position of NCMP 
A Non-constituency Member of Parliament ("NCMP") is a candidate of an opposition political party who, despite having lost in a general election, is declared elected as a Member of the Parliament of Singapore ("MP") by virtue of provisions in the Constitution and the Parliamentary Elections Act enabling the unsuccessful candidates who have performed the best to be accorded the status. The NCMP does not represent any constituency (or electoral division) in Parliament.

The NCMP scheme was introduced on 22 August 1984 by the Constitution of the Republic of Singapore (Amendment) Act 1984 and the Parliamentary Elections (Amendment) Act 1984. Under Article 39(1)(b) of the Constitution which was introduced by the constitutional amendment Act, the maximum number of NCMPs was set at six. However, the actual number that could be declared elected at any general election was fixed at three, less the total number of Opposition MPs elected to Parliament. The President, acting on the advice of the Cabinet, could order that between four and six NCMPs be declared elected for the purpose of a particular general election. Such an order ceased to have effect at the next dissolution of Parliament. On 1 July 2010, the need for a presidential order to increase the number of NCMPs was removed. Instead, the maximum number of NCMPs in Parliament was increased from six to nine, and the actual number that would be declared elected following a general election would be nine less the number of opposition MPs elected to Parliament.

On 9 November 2016, a bill to amend the Constitution was passed to increase the maximum number of NCMPs from nine to 12, and to confer upon NCMPs the same voting powers as elected MPs. NCMPs could exercise their enhanced voting powers with effect from 1 April 2017, while the procedure for electing up to 12 NCMPs after a general election was brought into effect on 2 January 2019.

Becoming an NCMP 
NCMPs have been called the "best losers" of each general election. As NCMPs are declared elected from candidates who fail to win at general elections, they are subject to the same qualifying criteria as elected MPs:

 They must be Singapore citizens aged 21 or above.
 Their names must appear in a current register of electors.
 They must have been residents of Singapore for at least ten years.
 They must be able to speak, read and write in at least one of the four official languages (English, Malay, Mandarin and Tamil).
 They must not be disqualified under Article 45 of the Constitution.

The Constitution and the Parliamentary Elections Act provide for a maximum of 12 NCMPs in Parliament. After the polling results for a general election have been released, the opposition candidates receiving the highest percentage of votes in their electoral divisions but not elected into Parliament will be offered NCMP seats. However, this is subject to several conditions. There must be fewer than 12 opposition members voted into Parliament, and the candidate must have garnered at least 15% of the total number of votes polled at the election in the contested electoral division. In addition, there can be no more than two NCMPs from one Group Representation Constituency ("GRC") and no more than one NCMP from an electoral division that is not a GRC (that is, a Single Member Constituency or SMC).

If the number of opposition candidates elected is fewer than 12, losing opposition candidates who have the highest percentage of votes during the election will be declared elected as NCMPs to make up the minimum number of opposition MPs. Hence, the number of NCMP seats offered is 12 minus the number of elected opposition MPs.

In the event that a group of candidates contesting in a GRC is offered an NCMP seat, the group must decide within seven days the person or persons to be declared elected as NCMPs and notify the returning officer. Elected NCMP must take an oath of allegiance to Singapore and to "preserve, protect and defend the Constitution of the Republic of Singapore". If this is not done at the first or second sitting of Parliament during its first session after the general election, Parliament may by resolution declare that the NCMP's seat has become vacant and that it will be filled by the next succeeding eligible candidate at the general elections, the candidates having priority based on the percentage of votes polled by them.

Opposition members who qualify to become NCMPs are allowed to reject their seats in Parliament. During the 2011 general election, several opposition leaders stated that they would not want to accept NCMP seats. Among them was Low Thia Kiang, the Secretary-General of the Workers' Party of Singapore ("WP").

Parliamentary role 
Before 1 April 2017, NCMPs could engage in debate in Parliament and were allowed to vote on all bills except the following:

 Amendments to the Constitution.
 Any motion pertaining to a bill to amend a supply bill, supplementary supply bill or final supply bill. (These are bills authorizing the Government to expend public money.)
 Any motion pertaining to a Bill to amend a money bill.
 A motion of no confidence in the Government.
 Removal of the President from office.

With effect from that date, they were conferred the same voting rights as elected MPs.

Reasons for the NCMP scheme 

During the Second Reading of the NCMP bill, the Prime Minister Lee Kuan Yew presented to Parliament three main justifications for the NCMP scheme. First, he said that having a minimum number of opposition members in Parliament through the NCMP scheme would provide younger People's Action Party ("PAP") MPs with sparring partners to "sharpen their debating skills". Secondly, the presence of opposition members in Parliament would educate the younger generation of voters about the role of a constitutional opposition and the limits of what it can do. He said this was especially important because the younger generation who had not lived and witnessed the conflicts within Parliament in the 1950s and 1960s "harbour[ed] myths about the role of an Opposition" and "had no idea how destructive an Opposition could be". Thirdly, the presence of non-PAP MPs in Parliament would act as a check and balance against any governmental impropriety. According to Lee, "some non-PAP MPs will ensure that every suspicion, every rumour of misconduct, will be reported to the non-PAP MPs". The readiness of non-PAP members to bring forth any allegation of misfeasance, or corruption, or nepotism would "dispel suspicions of cover-ups of alleged wrongdoings".

More importantly, the NCMP scheme was introduced to "ensure the representation in Parliament of a minimum number of Members from a political party or parties not forming the Government". The PAP possessed "unbroken hegemony" in Parliament from 1968 until 1981 when J. B. Jeyaretnam won a seat in the Anson by-election. As a result of his sole opposition presence in the Parliament, he could not initiate a meaningful debate in Parliament, being unable to find another MP to second his motions. The fact that there was absolutely no opposition representation in Parliament in the four general elections before 1984 (as indicated in the table below) added to the impetus for the inception of the scheme.

Criticisms 
The NCMP scheme has been the subject of criticism, both within the PAP and among opposition MPs and Nominated Members of Parliament (NMPs). During parliamentary debates in April 2010 on increasing the number of NCMPs from six to nine, several MPs expressed dissatisfaction with the lack of legitimacy and anti-democratic nature of the NCMP concept. For instance, PAP MP Alvin Yeo expressed doubts as to whether the NCMP scheme had served to raise the level of debate in Parliament, while NMP Calvin Cheng said:

The opposition has, from the introduction of the NCMP scheme, decried it as a "sham" and a "toothless" office. Opposition member J. B. Jeyaratnam questioned whether it was "a trick or a ploy" by the ruling party to maintain its dominance in Parliament. It has been argued that the system has placed the opposition at a disadvantage at general elections for a number of reasons. For one, there are restrictions on NCMPs as to what they can or cannot vote on in Parliament. Thus, it has been suggested that the presence of NCMPs in Parliament "does not seem to extend beyond the decorative and the provision of debating foils for the younger PAP generation unexposed to the gladiatorial quality of parliamentary debate". Moreover, the effectiveness of the NCMP scheme is limited by the perception that the NCMP is obliged to be adversarial by virtue of being party to the opposition. This is so even if privately the Member can apprehend the benefits of a Government proposal. Finally, the NCMP scheme has been criticized as a ploy to discourage voters from voting in opposition MPs because of the guarantee of at least a number of NCMP seats. This inhibits the natural growth of an elected opposition voice in Parliament as the electorate's motivation to vote in an opposition Member into Parliament is conceivably diluted by the assurance that a default mechanism exists for the "best losers".

Opposition MP Low Thia Khiang has cited an NCMP's lack of "muscle and real grassroot[s] grounding" as a reason for his refusal to take up an NCMP seat. NCMPs do not represent any constituency and are thus denied of opportunities to expand their influence.

During the 2010 debates, Sylvia Lim, then the sole NCMP in Parliament, commented that having NCMPs "make[s] a bad situation better, but increasing NCMPs is not the solution towards a more robust political system". She identified an NCMP's lack of any official capacity to represent the people or write letters on their behalf as a drawback of the scheme. Moreover, an NCMP has no physical base to organize activities or dialogues with the people. In her view, it would be better for politics in Singapore if the NCMP scheme was regarded merely as a "stop-gap measure" to deal with the lack of alternative voices in Parliament as a result of the ruling party's alleged abuse of the GRC system and gerrymandering.

In 2011 during a live television forum, Prime Minister Lee Hsien Loong refuted claims that NCMPs were not a "real opposition" by stating that the PAP had introduced and expanded the scheme "because it acknowledged both the desire among Singaporeans for alternative voices and the need for an opposition to represent the diverse views in society". He noted that NCMPs were free to debate issues in Parliament, and that the scheme provided opposition politicians with an opportunity to "establish themselves and strengthen their positions in subsequent general elections".

List of NCMPs 
In the 1984 general election, the first held after the NCMP scheme was introduced, as the opposition MPs J. B. Jeyaretnam of the WP and Chiam See Tong of the Singapore Democratic Party were elected to Parliament, the single NCMP seat available was allocated to the WP's M. P. D. Nair. However, the WP decided that its defeated candidates should not take up NCMP seats. Jeyaretnam, the WP's Secretary-General, said that the "real object" behind the scheme was to persuade the electorate to return the PAP to all the seats in Parliament, which was "the antithesis of what Parliament is". The NCMP seat was then allocated to Tan Chee Kien of the Singapore United Front, but his party also decided to reject the seat. This was regarded as a "resignation", and the NCMP seat was thus not filled.

The first NCMP to take up a seat in Parliament, Dr. Lee Siew Choh of the WP, did so following the 1988 general election at which Chiam See Tong was the only opposition MP elected. The WP's Lee and Francis Seow were declared elected as NCMPs on 16 September 1988. However, on 9 January 1989 the Speaker of Parliament Tan Soo Khoon announced that Seow had lost his seat with effect from 17 December 1988 under Article 45 of the Constitution after he was convicted and fined for tax evasion. In the general election that followed in 1991, a special provision was made for four instead of three NCMP seats, but none were offered because four opposition members were successful in their respective electoral divisions.

In the 1997 general election, it was back to the default three NCMP seats. After two opposition members were elected, one NCMP seat was offered to, and accepted by, J. B. Jeyaratnam. He was declared elected with effect from 14 January 1997. Subsequently, with effect from 23 July 2001, Jeyaretnam fell into bankruptcy due to an unpaid debt and thus lost his seat in Parliament. The general election that year saw one NCMP seat occupied by Steve Chia of the Singapore Democratic Alliance.

In the 2006 general election, Sylvia Lim, Chairman of the Workers' Party, garnered 43.9% of the votes in Aljunied GRC, making her the "best loser" of the election. She was subsequently declared elected as the next NCMP in Parliament on 12 May 2006.

Following the increase in the number of NCMP seats in Parliament to nine in 2010, since the Workers' Party garnered six seats at the 2011 general election, three NCMP seats were offered. They were taken up by Lina Loh from the Singapore People's Party who contested in Potong Pasir Single Member Constituency (SMC), and Yee Jenn Jong and Gerald Giam of the Worker's Party who contested in Joo Chiat SMC and East Coast GRC respectively.

In the 2015 general election,the Worker's Party garnered back six seats at the 2015 general election, three NCMP seats were offered. They were taken up by Dennis Tan who contested in Fengshan SMC and Leon Perera and Daniel Goh who contested in East Coast GRC of the Worker's Party.

In the 2020 general election, Tan Cheng Bock, led the PSP in West Coast GRC which garnered 48.32% of the votes, making them the "best loser" of the election. Two NCMP seats were offered. They were taken up by Leong Mun Wai and Hazel Poa from the Progress Singapore Party who contested in West Coast GRC, They were subsequently declared elected as the next NCMP in Parliament on 16 July 2020.

Notable issues raised by NCMPs 
NCMPs have raised and debated in Parliament a wide range of issues. What follows are some of the more notable issues mentioned.

Steve Chia 

In November 2002, NCMP Steve Chia supported a motion by the Minister for Education stating that "this House ... (1) supports the new JC [junior college] curriculum which will better develop thinking, communication and other process skills and engage students in greater breadth of learning; and (2) endorses greater diversity and opening of new pathways in JC/Upper Secondary education to cater to the different strengths and interests of students." He suggested that there should be a focus on "creative spontaneity", expressing the view that the education system in 2002 was one that focused on churning out a production line of workers, managers and instruction takers. Given that Singapore had reached the standards of a First World economy, Singapore should focus on instilling an inquisitive spirit within students, to encourage students to ask questions. He placed most emphasis on the importance of ensuring that the focus of education should be character building, stating: "It will be failure of our education system if we are to train our best and brightest with our best resources only to be told that they are going to be the quitters of our society; or that they lack the compassion for the weak and the down; or that they behave in a snobbish class of their own; or behave condescendingly to their peers and followers; or that the elites only care about their own self-interests."

In 2003, Chia mooted the idea that Singaporeans should be able to borrow from their own Central Provident Fund (CPF) savings to tide over periods of financial difficulty. His rationale was that if individuals could borrow from their own CPF accounts to buy depreciating property and money-losing stocks, there was no reason why they should not be allowed to do so to pay for bills. Dr. Ong Seh Hong, MP for Aljunied GRC, opposed the view, stating that it was important and for the good of Singapore that Singaporeans were independent individuals who could assume the risks and successes of their investments and be self-sufficient.

With the advent of the Integrated Resorts, which are casino-based vacation resorts, in 2005 Chia expressed concern in Parliament over whether the Government had systems and institutions in place to lessen their negative impact such as problem gambling and the spectre of people gambling away family assets.

Sylvia Lim 

Sylvia Lim was an NCMP from 2006 till Parliament was dissolved in 2011 for the general election held that year, at which she was elected as one of the MPs for Aljunied GRC. While she was an NCMP, Parliament debated the Human Organ Transplant (Amendment) Bill 2009 which would permit an organ donor to receive a reasonable amount of payment as a reimbursement for medical checks, insurance and other medical expenses, and loss of income. Lim spoke of her worry that the bill might lead to a backdoor organ trading and profiteering.

In 2010, Lim mooted the idea that the proportion of each Primary 1 cohort that would be seeking a university education should be increased beyond the 30% by 2015 that the Government was planning. She noted that in Organisation for Economic Co-operation and Development countries in 2006 about 37% of each age cohort received a degree-level education, and that a sizeable number of Singaporean students who failed to gain entry into local universities had done well in reputable universities overseas. She also suggested giving concessionary fares to disabled individuals who make up 2% of the adult population under 60 years.

Lim expressed concerns about a proposed constitutional amendment introduced in April 2010 that would allow magistrates to hear what are called "first mentions" through video conferencing. A first mention is a hearing that must be held within 48 hours of a person's arrest. She felt it failed to adequately assure accused people that they were allowed to complain to magistrates about injuries they had sustained or acts of misfeasance against them by the authorities. In response, Deputy Prime Minister and Minister for Home Affairs Wong Kan Seng assured MPs that processes would be in place to ensure that accused people are treated fairly. For example, during a video conference, an accused person will be alone in a room with no police officer, and will be able to see what is happening in the entire courtroom. Secondly, the screen that will be used is large enough for the judge to clearly see whether the accused is under duress. Finally, accused people who have been mistreated can either complain to the police or to the judge when they are later present in court.

The following month, during parliamentary debates on major revisions to the Criminal Procedure Code, Lim suggested there was a need to improve pre-trial disclosure procedures and to ensure that victims of crimes received redress. Further, she expressed concerns over the leniency of community-based sentencing. The bill eventually incorporated several of her suggestions.

In 2011, Lim noted that the Compulsory Education Act ensures that all children have the opportunity to receive an education. However, she expressed concern that processes for entry to schools for children with special needs were cumbersome. Furthermore, education for children with special needs was not subject to the same subsidies that students in mainstream schools had. She thus brought to the House's attention the fact that special needs children might have been unintentionally marginalized. These concerns were supported by Penny Low, MP for Pasir Ris–Punggol GRC.

See also 
 Member of Parliament
 Nominated Member of Parliament
 Parliament of Singapore
 Parliamentary elections in Singapore

References

Bibliography 
 
  ("PEA")

Further reading

Articles

Books 
 
 
 
 
 
 

1984 in Singapore
Singapore government policies